The Vickers 40 mm Class S gun, also known simply as the "S gun", was a 40 mm (1.57 in) airborne autocannon designed by Vickers-Armstrongs for use as aircraft armament. 

It was primarily used during World War II by British aircraft to attack ground targets. It was largely replaced by the RP-3 rocket from 1943 on.

Development 
The Vickers 40 mm Class S gun was developed in the late 1930s as defensive weapon for bomber aircraft. The ammunition was based on the 40x158R cartridge case of the 40 mm naval QF 2-pounder anti-aircraft gun (known as the "pom-pom"). The gun itself was derived from the Coventry Ordnance Works 37 mm gun which used a long-recoil operation to fire a  projectile. 

The Vickers S was tested in a turret mounting on a Mark II Vickers Wellington; this was not adopted for service.

In March 1941, researchers with the Fighter Interception Unit at RAF Tangmere fitted the fourth prototype Mk I Bristol Beaufighter night fighter with the Vickers S, installed asymmetrically, in the place of one of the standard 20 mm cannon. In August, the Rolls-Royce 40 mm cannon ("R" model) was also trialled in the same Beaufighter. Both cannons were assessed when fired in the air and on the ground. In October, the Vickers S was recommended for any future service use, although it was never incorporated into production Beaufighters. The reasons for this have remained unclear, although it may have reflected the perception that a single 40 mm cannon lacked advantages over the 2x20 mm configuration. In addition, Hawker Hurricanes, fitted with two Vickers S were trialled virtually simultaneously in North Africa, in the anti-tank role and this concept was also rejected.

 Combat history 
Early operations by the Desert Air Force in the North Africa campaign demonstrated that existing weapons were ineffective against newer German vehicles like the Panzer III medium tank. In April 1941 a group formed to study the issue, considered a series of 37 and 40 mm weapons including the "S", the Rolls-Royce cannon ("BF" variant), and the US-built M4 autocannon, all firing armour-piercing ammunition. The Rolls-Royce"BF" was initially selected, although it used drum-fed ammunition rather than the "S" belt system that was considered more reliable. About 200 BF guns were produced, but after a series of misfires and ammunition explosions, the decision was made to introduce ground attack variants of the Hawker Hurricane (designated Mark IID) with the "S". This had the added advantage that it carried 15 rounds of ammunition, compared to the "BF"'s 12.

Mark IID and Mark IV Hurricanes could mount one "S" under each wing, in conformal gun pods. The weight of the guns and ammunition, along with the dust filters and other equipment needed for desert operations, slowed the aircraft by a significant . By October 1941 it was decided that the autocannon would not be suitable in the future, and the same research group turned their attention to rockets, eventually leading to the introduction of the RP-3 in 1943.

The weapon was cleared for service on the Hurricane in April 1942 and formed up with No. 6 Squadron RAF at RAF Shandur in Egypt in May. The weapon's champion, Wing Commander Stephen Dru Drury, trained the pilots on using the weapon, as it had so much recoil that the aircraft slowed significantly when fired. This caused the nose to drop, and while flying at a typical altitude of  during the approach, firing without first re-adjusting the flight path was dangerous. The pilots eventually concluded that the guns could be fired twice before the aircraft flew past the target, although on rare occasions a third shot was possible.

Claims by pilots using the Vickers S included 47 tanks destroyed (of 148 tanks hit), as well as nearly 200 other vehicles. However, the Hurricane IID was poorly protected for the ground attack role and ground fire caused heavy losses. Mark IV Hurricanes - operational from 1943 - had improved armour around their engine, cockpit and fuel tanks. In addition, 40 mm ammunition was seldom effective against vehicles as well-armoured as the Tiger I heavy tank.

From 1944, Hurricanes armed with the Vickers S served in the South East Asian theatre. In most cases HE ammunition was used against road vehicles and rivercraft.

Assessments carried out in South East Asia showed a relatively high level of accuracy: an average of 25% of shots fired at tanks hit their target. By comparison, "60 lb" RP-3 rocket projectiles only hit 5% against tank-sized targets. However, 40 mm HE rounds were twice as accurate as AP rounds, possibly because the lower weight and higher velocity of the HE round gave it ballistics similar to that of the .303 in (7.7 mm) Browning machine guns that were used for sighting.

Aircraft weapons of comparable role and era 

37 mm Ho-203 – automatic ground-attack/anti-bomber gun
57 mm Ho-401 – automatic ground-attack gun

30 mm MK 103 – automatic anti-tank/anti-bomber gun
37 mm BK 3,7 – automatic anti-tank/ground-attack gun
50 mm BK 5 – automatic anti-tank/anti-bomber gun
50 mm MK 214A – automatic anti-tank/anti-bomber gun

37 mm NS-37 – automatic anti-tank/anti-bomber gun
45 mm NS-45 – automatic anti-tank/anti-bomber gun

57 mm akan m/47 – automatic anti-ship/ground-attack gun

40 mm Rolls-Royce Class BH – automatic anti-tank/ground-attack gun (development rival to the Vickers 40 mm Class S gun)
57 mm QF 6pdr Class M – autoloaded anti-ship gun (part of the same naming family as the Vickers 40 mm Class S)

Footnotes

References

Citations

External links 

Anthony G Williams, 37MM AND 40MM GUNS IN BRITISH SERVICE

40 mm artillery
Aircraft guns
Vickers
Autocannon
Anti-tank weapons
Weapons and ammunition introduced in 1942